Dysmas or Dismas is a male given name of Greek origin, derived from the Greek word "Δυσμάς"  dysmas, meaning "to the west". Related names include Dimas and Dyzma (Polish). The name may refer to:

Dismas Becker (1936–2010), American politician
Dismas Hataš (1724–1777), Bohemian composer
Dismas Nsengiyaremye (born 1945), Rwandan politician and Prime Minister

See also
Penitent thief

References

Greek masculine given names
pl:Dyzma